Brownie: Homage to Clifford Brown is an album by Helen Merrill, recorded in tribute to the trumpeter Clifford Brown.

Merrill had recorded an album with Brown in 1954.

Reception 

AllMusic reviewer Scott Yanow stated: "Throughout the often emotional date, Helen Merrill is heard in top form, giving plenty of feeling to the lyrics while leaving room for the guest trumpeters". The Penguin Guide to Jazz described it as a "classic session [... that] acted as a superb vehicle for Merrill's individual approach to time".

Track listing 
 "Your Eyes" (Clifford Brown, Helen Merrill) – 6:17
 "Daahoud" (Clifford Brown) – 2:58
 "(I Was) Born to Be Blue" (Mel Tormé, Bob Wells) – 5:16
 "I Remember Clifford" (Benny Golson, Jon Hendricks) – 7:00
 "Joy Spring" (Brown) – 3:59
 "I'll Remember April" (Gene de Paul, Patricia Johnston, Don Raye) – 7:14
 "Don't Explain" (Arthur Herzog Jr., Billie Holiday) – 6:18
 "Brownie" (Torrie Zito) – 5:04
 "You'd Be So Nice to Come Home To" (Cole Porter) – 4:33
 "I'll Be Seeing You" (Sammy Fain, Irving Kahal) – 4:53
 "Memories of You" (Eubie Blake, Andy Razaf) – 3:52
 "Gone with the Wind" (Herb Magidson, Allie Wrubel) – 2:28
 "Largo" (Samuel Barber, Antonín Dvořák) – 2:55

Personnel 
Musicians
 Helen Merrill – vocals
Roy Hargrove – flugelhorn, trumpet
Tom Harrell
Wallace Roney – trumpet
Lew Soloff
Roy Soloff
Torrie Zito – arranger, director, keyboards, music direction
Kenny Barron – piano
Rufus Reid – double bass
Victor Lewis – drums

Production
 Helen Merrill – producer
Patrice Beauséjour – art direction
Mark Agostino – assistant engineer
Brian Kinkland
Arthur Friedman
Jay Newland – engineer, mastering, mixing
Aissa Martin – hair stylist, make-up
Beth Kelly – photography
Cheung Ching Ming
Jean-Philippe Allard – producer

References 

Verve Records albums
Helen Merrill albums
1994 albums
Albums arranged by Torrie Zito
Clifford Brown tribute albums